Cortomobile is a four-wheeled cinema, designed inside a green Alfa Romeo 2000, year 1974. It can guest two viewers only, which can choose their own show, from a "short-menù", a list of short films and animations located beside the car.

Since its first screening in 2006, the turned-into-cinema vintage car has been performing in Florence, Venice, Rome, Turin and all over Tuscany. In 2009, Cortomobile has been protagonist of the First Car Film Festival in the province of Florence.

The "Short-menu"
During Cortomobile's performance, the viewers are invited to choose their own screenings from a Short-menu, a complete list of selected short films, animations and videos available, around forty. Among the directors included in the Short-menu: Adriano Valerio, Antonio Meucci, Simone Lecca.

Festival and stops 
2009
 Spring/Summer: Cortomobile On Tour - Sankt Pölten Höfefest (Austria); Fossano; Potenza.
 March: First Car Film Festival (Certaldo)

2008
 October: 4th Day of Contemporary
 Spring/Summer: Tuscany Tour - Florence; Centro per l'arte contemporanea Luigi Pecci Videominuto (Prato); Viareggio.

2007
 November: Torino Film Festival
 July: Pelago On the Road
 Spring/Summer: Tuscany Tour
 May: Facoltà di Architettura di Firenze

2006
 November: Creativity Festival Florence
 September: 63a Venice Film Festival
 July: Bacchereto (Prato), First stop

See also
 Short films
 Alfa Romeo 2000

Notes

References

 Jessica Goethals. "Film in motion finds its way through Florence." The Florentine.net, November 2, 2006

External links
Cortomobile Official Site

Animation film festivals
Film festivals in Italy
Short film festivals